Basilio Gabriel Costa Heredia (born 2 April 1990) is a professional footballer who plays as a midfielder for Alianza Lima. Born in Uruguay, Costa represents Peru internationally.

International career
Born in Uruguay, Costa was nationalized after years in Peru and gained a Peruvian passport. He debuted for the Peru national team in a friendly 1–0 loss to Ecuador on 6 September 2019.

Career statistics

Club

1 Includes Superliga Colombiana

Honours

Club
Alianza Lima
 Torneo del Inca (1):  2014

Sporting Cristal
 Peruvian Primera División (2): 2016, 2018

Colo-Colo
 Copa Chile (2): 2019, 2021
 Supercopa de Chile (1): 2022

References

External links 
 

1990 births
Living people
People from San Carlos, Uruguay
Peruvian footballers
Peru international footballers
Uruguayan footballers
Uruguayan emigrants to Peru
Naturalized citizens of Peru
Uruguayan Primera División players
Peruvian Primera División players
Rocha F.C. players
C.A. Bella Vista players
Rentistas players
Club Alianza Lima footballers
Sporting Cristal footballers
Colo-Colo footballers
Chilean Primera División players
Uruguayan expatriate footballers
Expatriate footballers in Chile
Association football midfielders